Gianfranco Goberti (19 November 1939 – 22 January 2023) was an Italian painter.

Life and career
Goberti was born in Ferrara on 19 November 1939. After studying Arts at the Institut Dosso Dossi in Ferrara, Italy, and at the Academy of Art in Bologna, he was teacher and Director of the Institut of Arts Dosso Dossi.
His first exhibition was held in 1959 with references to Pablo Picasso and Francis Bacon. His research dealt with nuova figurazione and Abstract Expressionism. The first optical-figurative period starts during the 1960s. In 1980, he was selected by the National Catalogue of Modern Art Bolaffi together with Paolini, Adami, Bulgarelli, Cassano and Paladino.
Goberti has held exhibitions at the International Art Expo of Bilbao, Quadriennale d'Arte in Rome, Rassegna Premio S. Fedele (Milan), Arte Fiera (Bologna), Altissima (Turin), Expo Arte (Bari), ArteExpo (Barcelona), and LineArt (Ghent), "La Venere svelata – La Venere di Urbino di Tiziano" (Brussels, Centre for Fine Arts, 10/10/2003-11/01/2004, Festival Internazionale EUROPALIA).

Vittorio Sgarbi wrote about the Goberti's art:
"Is the Goberti's art the element which should arouse new interest in our way of looking at and co-living with what is around us? Is maybe his technical ability? … The dominant aspect of the Goberti's art is the relationship between the Art and what it has been traditionally considered its subject, the Nature. ... The Art has always its specific language and a human substance even when it would camouflage in the Nature. This is the lesson, the revision of our mode of being in the world what Gianfranco Goberti proposes us."

Goberti died on 23 January 2023, at the age of 83.

Solo exhibitions 
 1959 – Teatro Comunale, Ferrara
 1961 – Il Chiostro di San Romano, Ferrara
 1962 – Galleria Panfilio, Ferrara
 1963 – Galleria Benedetti, Legnago
 1967 – Galleria Due Mondi, Roma; Galleria Il Saggittario, Bari; Galleria Duemila, Bologna
 1969 – Galleria San Vitale, Ravenna
 1970 – Galleria il Taghetto, Venice
 1971 – Galleria Carbonesi, Bologna
 1972 – Galleria Estense, Ferrara
 1977 – Galleria Duemila, Bologna
 1978 – Galleria Schubert, Milan; Accademia dei Concordi, Rovigo
 1979 – Galleria Ipermedia, Ferrara
 1983 – Galleria Andromeda, Trento; Drazek Art Gallery, Munich
 1984 – Galleria Schubert, Milan; Palazzo Del Governo, Pesaro; Galleria Civica, Codigoro; Palazzo Diamanti, Ferrara
 1985 – Galleria Spazio Uno, Madaloni
 1986 – Palazzo Pretorio, Certaldo; Palazzo Ducale, Urbino
 1987 – Galleria Schubert, Milan
 1989 – Rocca Possente, Stellata, Bondeno; Palazzo del Governatore, Cento
 1990 – Palazzo Comunale Nonantola; Galleria Cristina Busi, Chiavari; Galleria Dosso Dossi, Ferrara
 1992 – Galleria Schubert, Milan
 1994 – Galleria L'Ariete, Bologna; Galleria Schubert, Milan
 1996 – Galerie BSMD, La Decouverte, Parigi; Galleria Schubert, Milan
 1997 – Galleria Gnaccarini, Bologna; Sala Comunale "O. Marchesi", Copparo
 1998 – Galleria Schubert, Milan
 2000 – BezaArte, Ferrara
 2001 – Galleria Conforti, Cava dei Tirreni, Salerno; Galleria Schubert, Milan
 2002 – Galleria Roggia Grande, Trento; Galleria Fantasio & Joe, Lucca; Delizia del Verginese, Portomaggiore, Ferrara
 2004 – Galleria Del Carbone, Ferrara
 2005 – Galleria Palestro, Ferrara; Galleria "Dosso Dossi", Ferrara
 2008 – Galleria Arte Antica Bruschelli, Perugia
 2009 – Le carpe sacre di Sanli Urfa, Galleria "del Carbone", Ferrara
 2011 – Incontri d'Autore: #1, Galleria del Carbone, Ferrara; Il nodo del tempo, conversazione tra arte, filosofia e scienza. In: Notte dei ricercatori, September 23, 2011. A cura di: Davide Bassi, Marco Bertozzi, Gianfranco Goberti, University of Ferrara.
 2014 – Palazzo Turchi Di Bagno, Sistema Museale di Ateneo of the University of Ferrara, Ferrara; Opere leggere, studio dell'artista, Ferrara
 2015 – 60.10.50, Galleria del Carbone, Ferrara

Group art exhibitions 

 1965 – Quadriennale d'Arte di Roma
 1969 – Rassegna Premio S. Fedele, Milan
 1978, 1985, 2001 – Arte Fiera, Bologna
 1979 – Expo Arte, Bari
 1982 – Feria Internacional de Muestras, Bilbao
 2000 – Artissima, Torino
   – ArteExpo, Barcellona
 2003/2004 – LineArt (Gand), "La Venere svelata – La Venere di Urbino di Tiziano", Palais des Beaux-Arts, 10/10/2003-11/01/2004, Festival Internazionale EUROPALIA, Brussels
 2003 – Arte in Italia negli anni '70, Polo Umanistico, Erice (TP)
 2007 – Nuovo spazio: Inaugurazione, MLB Home Gallery, Ferrara
 2008 – Sebastiano tra sacro e profano, Monica Benini Arte, Ferrara; Pinacoteca G. Cattabriga, Bondeno (FE)
 2009 – Generazioni, Istituto d'Arte/Liceo Artistico Dosso Dossi, Ferrara
 2009 – Il cielo alla rovescia, Galleria del Carbone, Ferrara
 2010 – RTA: progetto Porta degli Angeli, Ferrara
 2011 – 54° Biennale di Venezia, Padiglione Italia, Rome, Palazzo Venezia, selected artists by the Fondazione Roma
 2012 – Ulisse Gallery, PERFHUMANCE: odori e viste attorno all’uomo, Ugo Attardi, Gianfranco Goberti, Sidival Fila, Giorgio Galli, Rome; Omaggio a Michelangelo Antonioni dagli amici della Galleria del Carbone, Galleria del Carbone (Ferrara)
 2013 – Angeli contemporanei, Galleria del Carbone (Ferrara); Künstler aus Ferrara, Italien, KREIS Galerie (Nürnberg)
 2014 – Nutrire la Pace, energia della vita, Sotheby's; Enrico Berlinguer e lo sguardo degli artisti, Camera dei Deputati, Roma; Galleria Civica of Andalo (Trento); Scandito ad Arte, Galleria del Carbone (Ferrara)
 2015 – Ombre della memoria con Flavia Franceschini, Ulisse Gallery, Roma; Acqua, farina, lievito... pane, Galleria Il Ponte, Pieve di Cento

Sources 
 Vittorio Sgarbi, Catalogo Palazzo Ducale, Urbino, 1985.
 Vittorio Sgarbi, Gli assenti hanno sempre ragione. L'Europeo, 12 July 1986.
 Rapidofine Bologna, Grafis 1986.
 Maria Luce Tommasi, Quei nodi inestricabili che stanno dentro di noi: una grande mostra di Goberti a Urbino, Ferrara, n. 5, 1986.
 Lucio Scardino, Officinaottanta, Ferrara, Liberty House, 1986.
 Gabriele Turola, Goberti, ironia graffiante per discutere il concetto di realtà, Ferrara, n. 8/9, 1987.
 Natalia Aspesi, Tra Matti e Bagatti, La Repubblica, 19 settembre 1987.
 Vittorio Sgarbi, catalogo Galleria Schubert, Milan 1987.
 Lucio Scardino, Per Schifanoia, Ferrara, Liberty House, 1987.
 Franco Solmi, Il tarocco come espressione d'arte, in Le Carte di Corte, La Nuova Alfa Editoriale, 1987.
 Lauro Manni, Goberti: trent'anni di avanguardia, La Piazza, n. 12, 1988.
 Vittorio Sgarbi, Goberti, Rosen, catalogo Rocca Possente di Stellata, 1989.
 King, mensile, ottobre 1989
 Eleonora Di cicco, Il tappeto come opera d'arte, Interni Annual, 1989.
 Bernard Wider, Goberti pittore ferrarese, catalogo Rocca Possente di Stellata, 1989.
 Fausto Gozzi, Intervista a Goberti in polaroid, catalogo Rocca Possente di Stellata, 1989.
 Oreste Zoboli, Goberti, Rosen, La Nuova Gazzetta di Modena, 17 January 1990.
 Gilberto Pellizzola, catalogo Galleria Cristina Busi, Chiavari, 1990.
 Vittorio Sgarbi, Gianfranco Goberti, tra reale e irreale, Art Leader, January–February 1992.
 Antonio Carbè, Goberti, la corda del desiderio, Leadership Medica, n. 1,1993.
 Lorenzo Bonini, catalogo Galleria L'Ariete, Bologna, 1994.
 Lorenzo Bonini, catalogo Galleria Schubert, Milan, 1994.
 Roberto Vitali, Mongolfiera, periodico, Bologna, 4 March 1994.
 Lorenzo Bonini, Colloquio con un artista del nostro tempo, Art Leader, n. 17, March–April 1994.
 Flaminio Gualdoni, catalogo Padiglione Arte Contemporanea, Ferrara, 1994–95.
 Vittorio Sgarbi, ll nostro modo di essere nel mondo, Grazia, 12 February 1995.
 Vittorio Sgarbi, La tensione lineare di Goberti, L'Italiano, Silvia Di Stefano, GB progetti, June 1996.
 Vittorio Sgarbi, Le trame della pittura, .
 Vittorio Sgarbi, Flaminio Gualdoni, 2000. Gianfranco Goberti: evasioni coatte. Editore L'Artiere Edizioni Italia, 18 tav. col., 50 pp.

References

External links
Artist's official website

1939 births
2023 deaths
Painters from Ferrara
20th-century Italian painters
Italian male painters
Italian contemporary artists
Modern artists
20th-century Italian male artists